Pietro Spagnoli (born 22 January 1964 in Rome) is an Italian operatic baritone. In the 2013/14 season, he sang Sulpice Pingot in Donizetti's La Fille du régiment at The Royal Opera, having made his debut there as Figaro in Il barbiere di Siviglia and having since sung Rambaldo Fernandez in La rondine.

References

Living people
Italian operatic baritones
1964 births
Musicians from Rome